Reagan Muhairwe (born 12 June 1992), commonly known as Ray G Rhiganz, is a Ugandan singer and songwriter. He mainly sings heritage music in Runyankore. He started singing in 2009 while at school until 2014 when he broke through with his hit song "Amarari". Ray has shared big stages with international artists like Eddy Kenzo, Meddy and Jose Chameleone on the Johnnie Walker Highball tour in Mbarara, He is among Allan Toniks, Sister Charity, Juliana Kanyomozi who come from Western Uganda. He has also collaborated with music heavy weights like Bebe Cool, Voltage music, Spice Diana, Serena Bata, Levixone, Truth 256.

He attended Ishaka Adventist Collage, for his both Uganda Certificate of Education and Uganda Advanced Certificate of Education which he completed in 2012 before breaking through to the music scene. He never joined university due to his parents’ failure to afford paying university tuition since he had a lot of siblings to attend school. He broke through to East African recognition after collaborating with Spice Diana on Omusheshe Song.

At his celebration for 10 years in the music industry, he broke a record of staging a highly attended concert in Western Uganda after it was successfully held on 14 September 2019 in Mbarara City. This pulled a lot of popular companies, like 91.3 Capital FM, Africell Uganda, 91.2 Crooze Fm and NBS Television.

In 2021, Ray G won an award of the best years act from Western Uganda, an award by New Janzi Awards, an award aimed at awarding Ugandan musicians in the creative art industry.

After the serious outbreak of COVID-19 pandemic, he appeared on the many raised voices that intended to sensitize the community about the deadly virus. This was done through the song he featured on Bebe Cool, Catherine Kusasira, titled Corana Distance.

In 2021, he was allegedly accused and dragged to court on account of breach of the performing contract, where Ray and his then manager Clifford had received USh 2 million to perform at a wedding party in Ibanda District and later had refused to repay.

In October 2022, He staged his first ever music concert at Imperial Royale Hotel in Kampala, the capital of Uganda.

Marriage Life
Ray G and Liz started dating in 2016 when Liz was working in Dubai.
During that period, she allegedly started funding some of his music, rented their house and bought some house hold items after Ray G had convinced her mum that he would marry Liz.
She started sending him money to buy a plot of land, farm, banana plantation and cows.

In 2019, Ray G told Liz that after his concert, he would wed her though she had suffered two miscarriages.

Since Annabell was a friend to Liz as she used to visit them numerous times at their home, It was that period when Ray g and Annabell came closer secretly and suddenly got pregnant, which forced Ray G to introduce and  wed her since she had refused to abort.

Liz was shocked, embarrassed, suffered mental breakdown and started drinking heavily. Later she went back to Dubai; however, she claims never to forgive Ray G.

In 2021 he officially wedded TV Presenter Annabelle Twinomugisha.  Towards the end of year, both tied a knot which was attended by his longtime friend and gospel artist Levixone who worked as a best man, and ceremony led by Bishop Sheldon Mwesigwa. He and his wife lost their newly second born and a daughter Kim. A moment that saw Ray G's ex-girlfriend Namara excited insisting that Ray would continue paying for her wasted time and money, but heavily publicly condemned by music lovers.

Awards 

 Best Western Act - Weeshe, Hipipo Music Awards.
Best written of the year- Omusheshe, Hipipo Music Awards 2020.
Outstanding Western Region artist - Janzi Music Awards.

Discography 

Nobanza
Yoya ft Levixone
All I can give
Rukundo ft Serena Bata - 2021
Make a Way - 2021
Yele ft Geosteady - 2019
Omusheshe - 2019
Eizooba - 2020
Winner ft Mc Kacheche - 2020
Weeshe - 2019
Owangye Omwigarire - 2016
Nuunu - 2017
Mureebe - 2014
Enshazi - 2012
Nokigambahoki - 2015
Ninkukunda - 2018
Nkaronda Lovely Nancy - 2018
Tibyempaka - 2018
Ringaaniza - 2020
Humuura - 2020
Naaba Nkwine - 2017
Amarari - 2012
Tayari - 2018
Weena - 2019
Ebindikwenda- 2013
Weekend - 2013
Hiihi my Love - 2018
Runkondo Nenyiga - 2014
Yaabare	
Amarari - 2012

References

21st-century Ugandan male singers
Living people
1992 births
People from Mbarara
People from Bushenyi District